This is a list of the shire presidents, administrators and mayors of Warringah Council, a former local government area of New South Wales, Australia. The official title of Mayors while holding office was: His/Her Worship The Mayor of Warringah. First incorporated on 7 March 1906 as Warringah Shire Council, the council became known as Warringah Council on 1 July 1993 following the enactment of a new Local Government Act which also stipulated that the term 'Shire President' be replaced with 'Mayor'.

Upon its establishment a temporary council of five nominated representatives was installed. The first meeting of this temporary council took place in the Narrabeen Progress Hall on 19 June 1906, with George Brock in the chair. The election of the first Warringah Shire Council took place on 24 November 1906, and the first meeting of the six elected councillors took place on 3 December, when Thomas Fisbourne was elected Shire President. Originally a role nominated by the council annually, from 2008 to 2016 it was directly elected every four years. The last Mayor of Warringah was Councillor Michael Regan (Your Warringah), elected in 2008, who served until the council's amalgamation into the new Northern Beaches Council, which was established with former Warringah administrator, Dick Persson, at its head.

Shire Presidents/Mayors and Deputy Shire Presidents/Deputy Mayors

Shire Clerks/General Managers
The Local Government Act, 1993 removed the requirement that the administrative head of a council be a "Town or Shire Clerk" and specified that the head was to be known as the "General Manager". Warringah Council had previously recognised the changing nature of role in appointing the last two Shire Clerks as "General Managers" and delegating wider authorities to them, which lasted from 1984 to 5 May 1993.

Notable office-holders
Notable presidents/deputy presidents and mayors/deputy mayors include:
Frank Beckman (1923–2017): Councillor 1962–1967, 1968–1985, 1987–1991, Deputy Shire President 1990–1991, Mackellar County Councillor 1969–1979. In 2001 he was awarded the Centenary Medal for "service to the community through local government".
John Bradford: Councillor 1977–1985, Deputy Shire President 1982–1983, 1985, Councillor Mackellar County Council 1977–1979 (Deputy Chair, 1979), Member of the Federal Parliament for McPherson 1990–1998.
John Caputo: Councillor 1987–2003, Shire President 1989–1991, Mayor 1998–1999. In 2000 he was awarded the Medal of the Order of Australia (OAM) for "service to the Italian community, to the community of Warringah, and to local government."
Paul Couvret: Shire President 1979–1983, Councillor 1973–1995. In 1998 he was awarded a Medal of the Order of Australia (OAM) "for service to local government through the Warringah Shire Council, to veterans, and to the community".
Brian Green: Councillor 1980–1999, Shire President 1991–1993, Mayor 1993–1995. In 2001 he was awarded the Centenary Medal for "service as former mayor and for active service to the community and local government".
Bob Giltinan: Councillor 2008–2016, Deputy Mayor 2012–2013, former professional international tennis player.
Andrew Humpherson: Councillor 1987–1992, Deputy Shire President 1991–1992, State Member for Davidson 1992–2007.
Ted Jackson (1921–2009): Councillor 1983–1991, Shire President 1985–1986, 1986–1989. Jackson later served as President of the Dee Why RSL Club for 23 years. On 31 May 1956 he received the British Empire Medal (BEM) for services to the Australian Army. In 1987 he was awarded the Australia Day RSL Achievement Award. On 11 June 1990 he received the Medal of the Order of Australia (OAM) for his "services to veterans & their families". In 2001 he was also awarded the Centenary Medal for services to veterans and Rotary's Community Service Award in 2002.
Arthur George Parr (1876–1931): Councillor (B Riding) 31 January 1920 – 1931, Shire President 1920–1925, 1926–1927. Responsible for completion of Warringah public lighting and electrification; second-longest-serving mayor or shire president.
Ellison Quirk: Manly Municipality Alderman 1896–1928, Mayor 1901–1906, Warringah Shire Councillor 1906–1922, Shire President 1910, 1913–1914, 1918–1919. State Member for Warringah 1901–1904.
Desmond Sainsbery: Councillor 1968–1977, Shire President 1976–1977. In 1993 he was awarded the Medal of the Order of Australia (OAM) for "service to youth and to sport in Warringah Shire."
Julie Sutton: Councillor 1980–1985, 1987–2003, 2008–2012, was the first and only female Mayor from 1995–1996 and 2002–2003.
Tom Webster: State Member for Wakehurst 1978–1984, Councillor 1991–1999, Deputy Mayor 1996–1997.

Other notable councillors, who did not hold office as President/Mayor or Deputy President/Deputy Mayor are:
Jason Falinski: B Ward Councillor 2008–2012, Member of the Federal Parliament for Mackellar 2016–date.
Walter Cresswell O'Reilly: Chief Commonwealth Film Censor 1928–1942, Mayor of Ku-ring-gai 1929–1933, D Riding Warringah Councillor 1939–1941.

References

External links
 Warringah Online (Council website)

Warringah
Mayors of Warringah
Mayors Warringah